Front Royal–Warren County Airport  is a public airport three miles west of Front Royal in Warren County, Virginia. The National Plan of Integrated Airport Systems for 2011–2015 categorized it as a general aviation facility.

Facilities
The airport covers 90 acres (36 ha) at an elevation of 709 feet (216 m). Its single runway, 10/28, is 3,007 by 75 feet (917 x 23 m) asphalt.

In the year ending July 31, 2010 the airport had 15,549 aircraft operations, average 42 per day: 97% general aviation, 2% military, and 2% air taxi. 45 aircraft were then based at the airport: 71% single-engine, 20% glider, 4% ultralight, 2% multi-engine, and 2% jet.

References

External links 
 Front Royal–Warren County Airport at Virginia Aviation Online
 Aerial image as of April 2001 from USGS The National Map
 

Airports in Virginia
Transportation in Warren County, Virginia
Front Royal, Virginia